"Drugs" is a song by Ammonia, released as their debut single from their debut album Mint 400 in 1995. The song was an instant hit and is still regarded as one of the band's most recognized songs.

Lead singer Dave Johnstone is quoted as saying, "There isn't really that much of a message. 'Drugs' is about apathy towards drugs." The song was written in five minutes during a rehearsal and peaked at #32 on the Australian Singles chart and came in at #27 on Triple J’s Hottest 100 for 1995. In North America, it reached #29 on the Billboard's Hot Modern Rock Tracks and #22 on the Canadian rock/alternative chart.

Formats & track listings
AUS CD single MATTCD022
"Drugs" – 3:27
"Realise" – 3:18
"Zoned" – 3:59
AUS promo CD single SAMPCD 3367
"Drugs" – 3:27
US promo CD single ESK 7681
"Drugs" – 3:27

Charts

References

1995 singles
Ammonia (band) songs
1995 songs
Murmur (record label) singles
Song recordings produced by Kevin Shirley